The 2022 Italian government crisis was a political event in Italy that began on 14 July. It includes the events that followed the announcement of Giuseppe Conte, leader of the Five Star Movement (M5S) and former Prime Minister of Italy, that the M5S would revoke its support to the national unity government of Mario Draghi over a bill regarding an economic stimulus to combat the ongoing energy and economic crisis. The government fell a week later when the M5S, Lega, and Forza Italia did not participate in a confidence vote for the government.

On 14 July, despite having largely won the confidence vote, Prime Minister Draghi offered his resignation, which was rejected by President Sergio Mattarella. On 21 July, Draghi resigned again after a new confidence vote in the Senate failed to pass with an absolute majority, following the defections of M5S, Lega, and Forza Italia; President Mattarella accepted Draghi's resignation and asked Draghi to remain in place to handle current affairs. A snap election was called for 25 September 2022.

Background 

The 2018 general election produced a hung parliament. From June 2018 until January 2021, the then-independent politician Giuseppe Conte served as prime minister in two different cabinets, one supported by a right-wing coalition (Conte I Cabinet) and another supported by a centre-left coalition (Conte II Cabinet). In January 2021, Matteo Renzi, leader of Italia Viva (IV), withdrew the support to Conte's cabinet, causing the fall of the government. After consultations, President Sergio Mattarella appointed Mario Draghi, a banker and former president of the European Central Bank, to lead a national unity government composed by M5S, League, Democratic Party (PD), Forza Italia (FI), IV, and Article One (Art.1).

During 2022, rumours arose around a possible withdrawal of M5S's support to the national unity government, including allegations that Draghi privately criticised Conte and asked M5S founder Beppe Grillo to replace him. Conte often criticised the government's economic policies, especially regarding the citizens' income, a guaranteed minimum income for Italian citizens living below the poverty line, as well as the superbonus 110% scheme, a building tax credit of up to 110%, which were both introduced by Conte's governments. Moreover, the tensions regarding military aid to Ukraine following the 2022 Russian invasion, caused also a split within the M5S, with the foreign minister Luigi Di Maio, who left the movement in June 2022, founding his own political party, Together for the Future (IpF), in opposition to Conte's criticism of weapons delivery to Ukraine. On 12 July, Draghi stated he would resign if the M5S withdrew its support to the government.

Political crisis 

During a press conference on 13 July 2022, Conte announced that the M5S would abstain during the confidence vote on the decreto aiuti, a government bill that introduced a €23 billion stimulus to contrast the economic and energy crisis caused by the COVID-19 pandemic and the ongoing Russo-Ukrainian war. Conte said he considered the economic aid package for families and small business proposed by the government "not enough to tackle the cost of living crisis". The decree also included a project to build a waste-to-energy plant in Rome, which was criticised by Conte and the M5S, who deemed it dangerous for the environment.

On 14 July, the decree was approved by the Senate of the Republic with 172 votes in favor, far above the majority threshold; the M5S left the Senate floor during the voting process. Despite not officially withdrawing the support to the government, this move was widely considered as a clear opposition to the government's policies, and de facto opened a political crisis within the Draghi Cabinet.

Following the M5S's abstention, Draghi consulted with President Mattarella about the crisis. After a few hours, Draghi resigned as prime minister; the resignation was promptly rejected by President Mattarella. In an official statement released by the presidential office, Mattarella invited the prime minister to address the Italian Parliament to explain the political situation that unraveled after the Senate vote. On 14 July, Lega also expressed the desire for a snap election, while the PD pledged to prevent a collapse of the government. On 16 July, 11 mayors sent a letter to Draghi asking him to revoke his resignation and stay as Prime Minister; by 19 July, the number increased to almost two thousand.

Confidence vote for Draghi's government 

On 20 July, Draghi addressed the Senate, reiterating his support for the European Union, NATO, and Ukraine, and saying it was fully necessary to bring to term the economic and justice reforms his government started. He also stated he was fully committed to investing more in renewable energy and green-friendly projects, and that he intended to keep the citizens' income, albeit with some modifications. He asked the senators to put aside their differences and ensure his government support and stability.

Following a discussion in the Senate, the government requested a confidence vote. Lega and FI announced that they would vote along with FdI and M5S against the government, saying that following M5S' refusal to participate in the confidence vote the previous Thursday the majority was too divided for the cabinet to be efficient going forwards. Due to the centre-right coalition and the M5S abstaining, the government won the confidence vote with only 95 ayes and 38 nays, failing to obtain an absolute majority. After the vote, the Minister for Regional Affairs Mariastella Gelmini left FI; on the following day, Renato Brunetta, historic member of FI and Minister of Public Administration, also left the party.

Draghi resigned again on the following day. President Mattarella accepted his resignation and asked him to remain in position to handle current affairs. On 21 July, Mattarella officially dissolved the Parliament and snap elections were called for 25 September 2022.

See also

 2018 Italian government formation
 2021–present global energy crisis
 2022 Italian general election
 COVID-19 pandemic in Italy
 COVID-19 recession
 Economic impact of the COVID-19 pandemic
 Opinion polling for the 2022 Italian general election

References

External links 
 Live updates (in Italian) at Sky TG24, last updated 21 July 2022
 Opinion polls in the aftermath (in Italian) at Sky TG24, published 21 July 2022

Government crisis
Government crises
2021 government crisis
Mario Draghi